Soverzene is a comune (municipality) in the province of Belluno in the Italian region of Veneto, located about  north of Venice and about  northeast of Belluno.

Soverzene borders the following municipalities: Erto e Casso, Longarone, Alpago, Ponte nelle Alpi.

References 

Cities and towns in Veneto